The 2009–10 Segunda Divisão season was the 76th season of the competition and the 60th season of recognised third-tier football in Portugal. Fátima were the defending champions.

Summary

The league was contested by 47 teams in 3 divisions with FC Arouca, Moreirense FC and União da Madeira winning the respective divisional competitions and the former two teams gaining promotion to the Liga de Honra.  The overall championship was won by FC Arouca.

Zona Norte

Stadia and locations

League table

Zona Centro

Stadia and locations

League table

Zona Sul

Stadia and locations

League table

Play-offs
The play-off for Liga de Honra, the teams play each other in a home and away round robin. However, they do not all start with 0 points. Instead, a weighting system applies to the teams standing at the start of the play-off mini-league.

Play-off table

Top goalscorers

References

Portuguese Second Division seasons
Port
3